Without Her (Persian: بی رویا, romanized: Bi Roya, lit. Without Roya) is a 2022 Iranian drama mystery thriller film directed and written by Arian Vazirdaftari and produced by Houman Seyyedi and Saeed Sadi. The film screened for the first time at the 40th Fajr Film Festival where it won the Crystal Simorgh for Best Actress for Tannaz Tabatabaei and earned 2 other nominations, one of which was for Shadi Karamroudi as the best actress in the supporting role and the other one for the director Arian Vazirdaftari as the Best Debut Film prize nominee. 

Without Her screened at the 79th Venice International Film Festival in the Horizons Extra section on September 6, 2022.

Premise 
Roya meets a girl named Ziba who has forgotten all of her past and she wants to help Ziba to find her family but after some days Roya starts to forget things about herself.

Cast 

 Tannaz Tabatabaei as Roya
 Shadi Karamroudi as Ziba
 Saber Abar as Babak
 Farank Kalantar
 Reza DavoudNejad
 Maedeh Tahmasebi
 Mojtaba Fallahi
 Nahal Dashti
 Mehri Al Agha
 Milad Yazdani
 Tiam Kermanian

Reception

Critical response 

The film was selected among one of The 10 best Middle Eastern and North African films of 2022 by the Middle East Eye website. Moreover, the Australian critic Shane Danielsen called it "a smart, expertly crafted psychodrama" in his Venice Film Festival review in The Monthly, which reminds you of those great Eastern European films of the ’60s and ’70s, from people such as Hungary’s Miklós Jancsó and Czechoslovakia’s Jan Němec, using metaphor and allusion to condemn the communist regimes under which their makers lived and worked.

Accolades

Notes

References

External links 

 

Iranian drama films
2020s Persian-language films
2022 drama films
2022 films